Momodou Bello N'Jie (born 13 November 1969) is a Gambian middle-distance runner. He competed in the men's 800 metres at the 1988 Summer Olympics.

References

1969 births
Living people
Athletes (track and field) at the 1988 Summer Olympics
Athletes (track and field) at the 1992 Summer Olympics
Gambian male middle-distance runners
Olympic athletes of the Gambia
Place of birth missing (living people)